Ali Shah (also Romanized as ‘Alī Shāh and ‘Alīshāh; also known as Ali-shakh) is a village in Sis Rural District of the Central District of Shabestar County, East Azerbaijan province, Iran. At the 2006 National Census, its population was 2,649 in 706 households. The following census in 2011 counted 3,751 people in 1,077 households. The latest census in 2016 showed a population of 3,010 people in 1,002 households; it was the largest village in its rural district.

References 

Shabestar County

Populated places in East Azerbaijan Province

Populated places in Shabestar County